Boss in the Mirror is a South Korean variety show hosted by Jeon Hyun-moo and Kim Sook. The show was initially aired as a pilot program on KBS2 on February 5–6, 2019. It premiered on April 28, 2019, as a regular program, and airs every Sunday at 17:00 (KST).

Synopsis 
This is a variety show where Korean bosses go through self-examination to create a better working environment for their employees. The show features a variety of industries and include guest appearances in the form of special MCs or people related to the bosses in the show.

Cast

Current

Past

Ratings 
 Highest ratings are listed for each episode.
 "—" denotes episode didn't enter top 20 in Nielsen Korea ratings.

Awards and nominations

Notes

References

External links 
 Official Website (in Korean)
 Boss in the Mirror on KBS World

Korean Broadcasting System
South Korean variety television shows
South Korean television shows
Korean-language television shows
2019 South Korean television series debuts